Hypseloecus is a genus of capsid bugs in the tribe Pilophorini, erected by Odo Reuter in 1891.  Records are mostly from Europe, with some in Africa, Asia and Australia.  The type species Hypseloecus visci is recorded from northern Europe including the British Isles.

Species 
According to BioLib the following are included:
 Hypseloecus amaltheia Linnavuori, 1992
 Hypseloecus amyemi Schuh & Menard, 2011
 Hypseloecus amyemicola Schuh & Menard, 2011
 Hypseloecus amyemopsis Schuh & Menard, 2011
 Hypseloecus castaneus Yasunaga, Yamada & Artchawakom, 2015
 Hypseloecus grossi Schuh & Menard, 2011
 Hypseloecus katrinae Yasunaga, Yamada & Artchawakom, 2015
 Hypseloecus koroba (Schuh, 1984)
 Hypseloecus lysiani Schuh & Menard, 2011
 Hypseloecus megistus G.Q. Liu & X. Zhang, 2011
 Hypseloecus metamyemi Schuh & Menard, 2011
 Hypseloecus morobe (Schuh, 1984)
 Hypseloecus neoamyemi Schuh & Menard, 2011
 Hypseloecus nigrobrevis Yasunaga, Yamada & Artchawakom, 2015
 Hypseloecus paramyemi Schuh & Menard, 2011
 Hypseloecus phuvasae Yasunaga, Yamada & Artchawakom, 2015
 Hypseloecus sakaerat Yasunaga, Yamada & Artchawakom, 2015
 Hypseloecus schuhi Symonds, 2012
 Hypseloecus schuhianus Yasunaga, Yamada & Artchawakom, 2015
 Hypseloecus sericosagus Yasunaga, Yamada & Artchawakom, 2015
 Hypseloecus siamensis Yasunaga, Yamada & Artchawakom, 2015
 Hypseloecus takahashii Yasunaga, 2001
 Hypseloecus tamaricis (Linnavuori, 1975)
 Hypseloecus visci (Puton, 1888) – type species (as Sthenarus visci Puton 1888)

References

External links
 

Miridae genera
Hemiptera of Europe
Phylinae